Bad Piggies is a puzzle video game developed by Rovio Entertainment, and was the company's first spin-off of Angry Birds. The game launched on Android, iOS, Windows, and Mac on September 27, 2012. It was released for BlackBerry 10 in October 2013 and for Windows Phone in April 2014. Unlike the Angry Birds games, the player assists the minion pigs in building contraptions that travel on land and in air to collect pieces of a map to ultimately capture and take away the Angry Birds’ eggs. As of October 2012, Bad Piggies was the fastest-selling game on the Apple App Store, and the quickest one to reach the top of the app list in just three hours.

In June 2014, Rovio made Bad Piggies free-to-play, since it previously had a purchase price. Advertisements were also implemented.

Between April 2019 and July 2019, the game was removed from the Google Play Store and App Store respectively. But in early 2020, the game was added back worldwide.

In June 2021, a sequel titled Bad Piggies 2 was announced through ads on TikTok, which lead to a GeekLab page where users could take a survey about the game.

Gameplay

Levels

The main objective of Bad Piggies is to create a contraption out of the materials provided, using it to reach a goal at the end of the level. The parts that are given vary in abilities and quality, some requiring manually launching the part, such as rockets and soda bottles, and others requiring the use of motors to run automatically. As the game obeys the laws of gravity, parts can break upon force and some are heavier than others. Certain parts, such as metal as opposed to wood, have stronger durability. The player can also use power-ups if having difficulty completing the level, giving perks such as making the vehicle faster, making parts more durable, or a mechanic pig that will build a contraption for the player. Contraptions made of wood are more vulnerable to KRAKING and SNAPPING than metal. 

Although it is required to reach the end goal to move on to the next level, there are optional hindrances and collectibles to fully complete a level and get three stars; these range from collecting "star boxes" in varying locations or completing the level with a time limit, or contraption limitations such as not using specific parts or completing the level without the machine breaking. Daily, three crates can be found in random levels. When collected, the player is awarded items and power-ups, sometimes even customizable skins for the parts. There's also the chance of getting bolts, which can be used to create a random part skin. Crates vary in the rewards given and are based on what type of crate it is, such as wood, cardboard paper, glass, silver, bronze, marble, or gold.

Levels are organized into sections, each covering specific parts to use in the contraptions. Apart from regular levels, there are other additional modes; sandbox levels don't have specific goals and are one large level, filled with twenty or forty star boxes that could be collected. The sandbox levels give more parts than usual and a wider build area to build larger contraptions. The “Super Mechanic” is not on sandboxes, as there are no goals in them.  "Road Hogs" are longer levels with the objective of creating the fastest vehicle possible. "Cake Race" puts the player against a computer opponent, competing to collect five cupcakes that are scattered throughout the level. Points are awarded after collecting as many as possible in the time limit and are determined by how quickly they were obtained. The winner is given a random type of crate.

The game also has the "Field of Dreams" mode, in which they are the same as the sandbox levels, except players now have access to every item in the game, and unlimited power-ups. Each map also has 40 star boxes to collect. Players need to buy the mode with real-life money.

In other media

Television

On April 11, 2014, Rovio released Piggy Tales, a clay animated TV series based on the game, and a spin-off of Angry Birds Toons, which features a closer glimpse of the life of the minion pigs. A sequel was released on April 17, 2015 entitled Pigs At Work, in which features the pigs in short clips themed after construction.

Film
The game's main character appears in The Angry Birds Movie, named Ross and voiced by Tony Hale. He is one of Leonard's closest accomplices in the Birds' schemes. The Piggy Tales episode all about vehicles is Fly Piggy, Fly.

Reception

The game has received positive reviews with a Metacritic score of 83/100 based on 24 reviews.

Mark Brown of Pocket Gamer gave the game a Silver Award and called it "creative, addictive, and absolutely packed with content", while lamenting that it felt "a little too safe and predictable". IGN rated it the best mobile game of 2013.

References

External links

 
 
 
 

2012 video games
Puzzle video games
Free-to-play video games
Angry Birds spin-offs
IOS games
MacOS games
Windows games
Windows Phone games
BlackBerry 10 games
Rovio Entertainment games
Android (operating system) games
Video games about pigs
Fictional pigs
Video games developed in Finland